L'apparenza (The appearance) is an album by the Italian singer and songwriter Lucio Battisti. It was released on 7 October 1988 by Numero Uno.

The album was Italy's 17th best-selling album in 1988.

Track listing 
All lyrics written by Pasquale Panella, all music composed by Lucio Battisti.
 "A portata di mano" (Handy) – 5:17
 "Specchi opposti" (Opposed Mirrors) – 4:19
 "Allontanando" (Departing) – 4:41
 "L'apparenza" (The Appearance) – 4:35
 "Per altri motivi" (For Other Reasons) – 4:18
 "Per nome" (By Name) – 5:23
 "Dalle prime battute" (From The First Beats) – 4:57
 "Lo scenario" (The Scenario) – 4:38

References

1988 albums
Lucio Battisti albums